Damiano Ngwila Musonda (born 15 August 1945) is a Zambian long-distance runner. He competed in the marathon at the 1980 Summer Olympics.

References

External links
 

1945 births
Living people
Athletes (track and field) at the 1972 Summer Olympics
Athletes (track and field) at the 1980 Summer Olympics
Zambian male long-distance runners
Zambian male marathon runners
Olympic athletes of Zambia
Athletes (track and field) at the 1978 Commonwealth Games
Commonwealth Games competitors for Zambia
Place of birth missing (living people)